The Holberg Medal (Danish: Holberg-Medaljen) is an award to a Danish author of fiction or writer on science. It is an appreciation of a literary or scientific work or of the award winner's authorship as a whole. The prize is often awarded on 3 December, the birthday of Ludvig Holberg. The first award was given in 1934 in connection with the 40th anniversary of the Danish association of authors.

Prize winners 
1934 – Vilhelm Andersen
1935 – Sven Clausen
1937 – Valdemar Rørdam
1938 – Th.A. Müller
1939 – Jacob Paludan
1940 – Thit Jensen
1941 – Henrik Pontoppidan
1942 – Frederik Poulsen
1943 – Otto Rung
1944 – Johannes Jørgensen
1945 – Tom Kristensen
1946 – Harry Søiberg
1947 – Carl Erik Soya
1948 – Paul la Cour
1949 – Karen Blixen
1950 – Hans Hartvig Seedorff Pedersen
1951 – Torben Krogh
1952 – Martin A. Hansen
1953 – Helge Topsøe-Jensen
1954 – H.C. Branner
1955 – Knuth Becker
1956 – Palle Lauring
1957 – Kjeld Abell
1958 – F.J. Billeskov Jansen
1959 – Knud Sønderby
1960 – William Heinesen
1961 – Robert Neiiendam
1962 – Finn Methling
1963 – Otto Gelsted
1964 – Morten Borup
1965 – Hans Scherfig
1966 – Aage Dons
1967 – Hakon Stangerup
1968 – Willy-August Linnemann
1969 – Steen Eiler Rasmussen
1970 – Rudolf Broby-Johansen
1971 – Leif Panduro
1972 – K.E. Løgstrup
1973 – Villy Sørensen
1974 – Oluf Friis
1975 – Aage Kragelund
1976 – Elsa Gress
1977 – Jens Kruuse
1978 – Erik Knudsen
1979 – Klaus Rifbjerg
1980 – Aage Hansen
1981 – Svend Kragh-Jacobsen
1982 – Heðin Brú
1983 – Thorkild Bjørnvig
1984 – Lise Sørensen
1985 – Jørgen Gustava Brandt
1986 – Halfdan Rasmussen
1987 – Inger Christensen
1988 – Svend Eegholm Pedersen
1989 – Ulla Ryum
1990 – Svend Aage Madsen
1991 – Sven Holm
1992 – Suzanne Brøgger
1993 – Erik A. Nielsen
1994 – Ole Wivel
1995 – Henrik Stangerup
1996 – Astrid Saalbach
1997 – Per Højholt
1998 – Jess Ørnsbo
1999 – Carsten Jensen
2000 – Bent Holm
2001 – Benny Andersen
2002 – Keld Zeruneith
2003 – Ebbe Kløvedal Reich
2004 – Erling Jepsen
2005 – Thomas Bredsdorff
2006 – Line Knutzon
2007 – Klaus Peter Mortensen
2008 – Anders Matthesen
2009 – Jørn Lund
2010 – Nikoline Werdelin
2011 – Ursula Andkjær Olsen
2012 - Rune Lykkeberg
2013 - Henning Mortensen
2014 - Karen Skovgaard-Petersen
2015 - Dorrit Willumsen
2016 - Ivar Gjørup
2017 - Kaspar Colling Nielsen
2018 - Peter Zeeberg
2019 - Helle Helle
2020 - Birgitte Possing
2021 - Dorte Karrebæk

References 

Danish literary awards
Awards established in 1934
1934 establishments in Denmark